The 1143 papal election followed the death of Pope Innocent II and resulted in the election of Pope Celestine II.

Election of Celestine II

Pope Innocent II died on 24 September 1143, at Rome. During the first eight years of his pontificate he faced the schism with Antipope Anacletus II (1130–1138), which finally ended in May 1138 with abdication and submission of Anacletus’ successor Antipope Victor IV (1138). The Second Lateran Council in April 1139 deposed from the ecclesiastical offices all former adherents of the Anacletus. However, despite the triumph over the antipope, the last years of Innocent's pontificate were not successful - papal armies were defeated by King Roger II of Sicily, who had received the crown from Anacletus II and demanded the recognition of his title from Innocent II. After the lost battle of Galluccio on 22 July 1139 the pope was taken prisoner by Roger and was forced to confirm all privileges given to the king by Anacletus II. Soon afterwards new serious problem arose at the city of Rome. In 1143, shortly before Innocent's death, the Roman people created a municipal commune which rejected the secular rule of the Papacy in the Eternal City. The election of Innocent's successor took place in the shadow of this municipal revolution.

The cardinals present at Rome assembled in the Lateran Basilica and on 26 September 1143 elected Cardinal Guido del Castello of S. Marco, who had previously served as legate of Innocent II before king Roger in 1137, and was the first cardinal known to hold the title of magister. He took the name Celestine II and was consecrated on the same day.

Cardinal-electors
There were probably 30 cardinals in the Sacred College of Cardinals in September 1143. Basing on the examination of the subscriptions of the papal bulls in 1143 and the available data about the external missions of the cardinals it is possible to establish that no more than 23 cardinals participated in the election:

Eighteen electors were created by Pope Innocent II, two by Pope Callixtus II, one by Pope Honorius II and one by Pope Paschalis II.

Absentees

Notes

Sources

12th-century elections
1143
1143
1143 in Europe
12th-century Catholicism